Thornton House is a historic house in Stone Mountain, Georgia.

Thomas Redman Thornton (1769–1826) constructed the house around 1790 at Union Point, Georgia. The house was moved in the late 1960s by the Atlanta Art Association to a location behind the High Museum of Art in Midtown Atlanta. Then the house was moved again in 1968 for final reconstruction in Stone Mountain Park.

See also
List of the oldest buildings in Georgia

References

Tourist attractions in Atlanta